Zavitinsk is a town in Amur Oblast, Russia.

Zavitinsk may also refer to:
Zavitinsk Urban Settlement, an administrative division and a municipal formation which the town of Zavitinsk and three rural localities in Zavitinsky District of Amur Oblast, Russia are incorporated as
Zavitinsk (air base), an air base in Amur Oblast, Russia